Edson Luiz Martins dos Santos (born 19 August 1988), known simply as Pereira, is a Brazilian footballer who plays as a midfielder for Grêmio Novorizontino.

He has represented a number of other clubs at Campeonato Brasileiro Série B level, including Vila Nova, Vitória, Joinville and Santa Cruz.

References

External links

1988 births
Living people
Footballers from São Paulo
Brazilian footballers
Association football midfielders
Campeonato Brasileiro Série B players
Campeonato Brasileiro Série C players
Campeonato Brasileiro Série D players
Vila Nova Futebol Clube players
Clube Atlético Linense players
Fortaleza Esporte Clube players
Boa Esporte Clube players
Marília Atlético Clube players
Comercial Futebol Clube (Ribeirão Preto) players
Grêmio Novorizontino players
Esporte Clube Juventude players
Esporte Clube Vitória players
Joinville Esporte Clube players
Sertãozinho Futebol Clube players
Santa Cruz Futebol Clube players
Cuiabá Esporte Clube players
Associação Portuguesa de Desportos players
Grêmio Esportivo Brasil players